Starr County is located in the U.S. state of Texas. As of the 2020 census, its population was 65,920. Its county seat is Rio Grande City. The county was created in 1848. It is named for James Harper Starr, who served as secretary of the treasury of the Republic of Texas.

Starr County comprises the Rio Grande City micropolitan statistical area, which also includes other small cities, which itself is part of the larger Rio Grande Valley region. It is directly northeast of the Mexican border.

The county population is almost entirely Hispanic or Latino. With 97.7% of its population identifying as such, it is the county with the highest proportion of Hispanics in the continental United States.

History
From 2000 to 2010, the population of Starr County increased from 53,597 to 60,968.

Geography

Major highways
  U.S. Highway 83

Adjacent counties and municipalities

 Jim Hogg County (north)
 Brooks County (northeast)
 Hidalgo County (east)
 Zapata County (northwest)
 Camargo Municipality, Tamaulipas, Mexico (south)
 Guerrero, Tamaulipas, Mexico (northwest)
 Gustavo Díaz Ordaz, Tamaulipas, Tamaulipas, Mexico (south)
 Mier Municipality, Tamaulipas, Mexico (south)
 Miguel Alemán Municipality, Tamaulipas, Mexico (south)

National protected area
 Lower Rio Grande Valley National Wildlife Refuge (part)

Demographics

As of the 2020 United States census, 65,920 people, 16,281 households, and 12,836 families were residing in the county. As of the 2010 United States Census, 60,968 people living in the county. About 0.4% were Non-Hispanic White, 0.2% Asian, 0.1% Native American, 0.1% Black or African American, 3.0% of some other race, and 0.5% of two or more races; 95.7% were Hispanic or Latino (of any race). According to the Census Bureau, Starr County had the highest percentage of Hispanic residents of any county in the United States, and the lowest percentage of non-Hispanic White residents.

As of the census of 2000,  53,597 people, 14,410 households, and 12,666 families were living in the county. The population density was 44 people per square mile (17/km2). The 17,589 housing units had an average density of 14/sq mi (6/km2). The racial makeup of the county was 87.92% White, 0.15% African American, 0.25% Native American, 0.28% Asian, 9.95% from other races, and 1.46% from two or more races.

Of the 14,410 households, 54.7% had children under 18 living with them, 66.5% were married couples living together, 17.4% had a female householder with no husband present, and 12.1% were not families. About 11.3% of all households were made up of individuals, and 5.9% had someone living alone who was 65or older. The average household size was 3.69, and the average family size was 4.01.

In the county, the age distribution was 37.4% under the age of 18, 11.0% from 18 to 24, 27.1% from 25 to 44, 16.3% from 45 to 64, and 8.2% who were 65 or older. The median age was 26 years. For every 100 females, there were 94.20 males. For every 100 females 18 and over, there were 88.10 males.

The median income for a household in the county was $16,504, and for a family was $17,556. Males had a median income of $17,398 versus $13,533 for females. The per capita income for the county was $7,069, which is the third-lowest in the United States. About 47.40% of families and 50.90% of the population were below the poverty line, including 59.40% of those under age 18 and 43.30% of those age 65 or over.

As of 2009 the median household income was $22,418.

Politics

Law enforcement
In the 1970s and into the 1980s, federal law-enforcement officials concentrated their efforts against drug smuggling on Starr County.

On May 1, 2009, the former sheriff of Starr County, Reymundo Guerra, a Democrat, pleaded guilty in federal court to a narcotics conspiracy charge.

In April 2016, Starr County Justice of the Peace Salvador Zarate Jr., faced up to 20 years imprisonment and a $10,000 fine on two counts of bribery for accepting a $500 bribe in exchange for reducing bond on two persons arrested on narcotics charges in an incident on Christmas Eve 2014. He was found not guilty of possession of a controlled substance. Zarate was expected to appeal any sentence rendered.

Presidential elections 
Starr County has long been a strongly Democratic county, but has suffered from low voter turnout with only about 20% of its 53,000 residents voting. No Republican has won the county for president since incumbent Benjamin Harrison in 1892; as of 2020, Starr has the longest streak of voting for Democrats in the entire country. Its streak is currently almost triple the length of Minnesota's Democratic streak, which began in 1976. In 1988, the county gave Michael Dukakis his highest vote share in the nation. In 2008, Illinois Senator Barack H. Obama won Starr County with 8,233 votes (84 percent). In the most recent election, Donald Trump came within five points of winning the county, receiving 8,224 votes (47 percent) to Joe Biden's 9,099 (52 percent). This was a major shift from Hillary Clinton's 60-point margin of victory four years earlier, and represented the strongest pro-Trump swing of any county in the nation.

Education
Residents of eastern Starr County are zoned to schools in the Rio Grande City Consolidated Independent School District. Residents of western Starr County are zoned to schools in the Roma Independent School District. Residents of northeastern Starr County are zoned to schools in the San Isidro Independent School District.

The Roman Catholic Diocese of Brownsville operates area Catholic schools. Immaculate Conception School, located in Rio Grande City and founded in 1884, is the only Catholic school in Starr County and provides a faith-based pre-K through eighth-grade education to approximately 250 students each year.

All of the county is in the service area of South Texas College.

Communities 
As of 2011, Starr County has about 55 colonias. By 2011, many families were moving to the colonias.

Between the 2000 and 2010 censuses, Starr County went through many changes. Four CDPs were deleted, one gained area, 12 lost area, and 92 new CDPs were created. Only 11 remained unchanged.

Cities
 Escobares
 La Grulla
 Rio Grande City (county seat)
 Roma

Unincorporated communities
 La Gloria
 La Reforma
 Santa Catarina
 Santa Elena

Former communities
 Viboras

Census-designated places

 Airport Heights
 Alto Bonito Heights
 Amada Acres
 Anacua
 B and E
 Barrera
 Benjamin Perez
 Buena Vista
 Camargito
 Campo Verde
 Casa Blanca
 Casas
 Chaparrito
 Chapeno
 Delmita
 East Alto Bonito
 East Lopez
 El Brazil
 El Castillo
 El Cenizo
 El Chaparral
 El Mesquite
 El Quiote
 El Rancho Vela
 El Refugio
 El Socio
 Elias-Fela Solis
 Escobar I (former)
 Eugenio Saenz
 Evergreen
 Falcon Heights
 Falcon Village
 Falconaire
 Fernando Salinas
 Flor del Rio
 Fronton
 Fronton Ranchettes
 Garceno
 Garciasville
 Garza-Salinas II
 Guadalupe-Guerra
 Gutierrez
 H. Cuellar Estates
 Hilltop
 Indio
 Jardin de San Julian
 JF Villarreal
 La Carla
 La Casita
 La Chuparosa
 La Escondida
 La Esperanza
 La Loma de Falcon
 La Minita
 La Paloma Ranchettes
 La Puerta
 La Rosita
 La Victoria
 Lago Vista
 Las Lomas
 Loma Linda East
 Loma Linda West
 Loma Vista
 Longoria
 Los Alvarez
 Los Arrieros
 Los Barreras
 Los Ebanos
 Manuel Garcia
 Manuel Garcia II
 Martinez
 Mesquite
 Mi Ranchito Estate
 Miguel Barrera
 Mikes
 Moraida
 Narciso Pena
 Netos
 Nina
 North Escobares
 Northridge
 Old Escobares (former)
 Olivia Lopez de Gutierrez
 Olmito and Olmito
 Pablo Pena
 Palo Blanco
 Pena
 Quesada
 Rafael Pena
 Ramirez-Perez
 Ramos
 Ranchitos del Norte
 Rancho Viejo
 Regino Ramirez
 Rivera (former)
 Rivereno
 Roma Creek
 Salineño
 Salineño North
 Sammy Martinez
 San Fernando
 San Isidro
 San Juan
 Sandoval
 Santa Anna
 Santa Cruz
 Santa Rosa
 Santel
 Sunset
 Tierra Dorada
 Valle Hermoso
 Valle Vista
 Victoria Vera
 Villarreal
 West Alto Bonito
 Zarate

Economy
Starr is especially known for oilseeds and dry beans, one of the highest-producing counties in the state.

See also

 National Register of Historic Places listings in Starr County, Texas
 Recorded Texas Historic Landmarks in Starr County

References

External links
 Starr County Government
 Starr County in Handbook of Texas Online at the University of Texas
 Starr County Profile from the Texas Association of Counties

 
Lower Rio Grande Valley
1848 establishments in Texas
Populated places established in 1848
Majority-minority counties in Texas
Hispanic and Latino American culture in Texas